Kiu Tsui Country Park is a  country park in Sai Kung District, Hong Kong. The park opened in 1979 and includes features such as:

Hap Mun Bay Beach on Sharp Island
Kiu Tsui Beach on Sharp Island

The park has eight outlying islands within its boundaries:
 Kiu Tsui Chau (Sharp Island)
 Kiu Tau, an inshore islet linked to Sharp Island by a tombolo only at low tide
 Pak Sha Chau
 Tai Tsan Chau
 Siu Tsan Chau
 Cham Tau Chau
 Yau Lung Kok
 Tuen Tau Chau

See also
 Inner Port Shelter
 Conservation in Hong Kong

External links
Agriculture, Fisheries and Conservation Department: Kiu Tsui Country Park

Country parks and special areas of Hong Kong
Sai Kung District
1979 establishments in Hong Kong